Domed can have several meanings:

Dome - in architecture
Domed consonant - a consonant type classified by domed tongue shape